Young Effectuals is the second release from the Portland-based band The Helio Sequence.  It was released on October 9, 2001, by Cavity Search Records.  It is less pop-oriented than their later albums, and it features longer songs densely layered with synthesizers.

Reception

In his review of the album for AllMusic, Richie Unterberger says the Helio Sequence combine "dense electric textures in which the voice is just another hazy element with atmospheric keyboards, guitar, and electronic effects", but that the songs eventually blur "together into similar overall moods as the disc progresses."

Track listing
"Reh.Vuh.Lee" - 2:19
"Give, Give, Give" – 4:41
"(Square) Bubbles" – 5:57
"Knots" – 6:47
"The Echo-Blomp" – 4:44
"Nothing's Ok: Everything's Fine" – 4:54
"Cut The Camera" – 5:59
"Fall And Winter/Necktie Noose" – 6:04
"Kablerium Vs. Obliviousity" – 5:37
"Take, Take, Take" – 6:59

Credits 
 Christopher Cooper - Graphic design, visual arts
 John Eckenrode - Graphic design, visual arts
 The Helio Sequence - Producer, engineer, mixing
 Michael McGuire - Photography
 Brandon Summers - Guitar, vocals, graphic design, visual arts
 Benjamin Weikel - Drums, keyboards, vocals, engineer, mastering
 Juleah Weikel - Graphic design, visual arts

References

External links 
 Young Effectuals review at PopMatters

2001 albums
The Helio Sequence albums
Cavity Search Records albums